Events from the year 1717 in Denmark.

Incumbents
 Monarch – Frederick IV
 Grand Chancellor – Christian Christophersen Sehested

Events

 13–14 May – Battle of Gothenburg, battle of the Great Northern War.
 25 December  The Christmas Flood of 1717 affects the west coast of Sønderjylland.

Undated
 Planters move from Saint Thinas to Saint John. leading to Denmark claiming the island in 1718.

Births
 27 October  Hans Hagerup Gyldenpalm, jurist and government official (died 1781)

Deaths
 1 July  Princess Anna Sophie of Denmark (born 1536)
 21 December  Gustav Wilhelm Wedel Jarlsberg, general (born 1641)

References

 
1710s in Denmark
Denmark
Years of the 18th century in Denmark